Ravindra Prabhat (born 5 April 1969) is a Hindi novelist, journalist, poet, and short story writer from India.

Early life and education
Prabhat was born on 5 April 1969 in the village of Mahindwara, Sitamarhi, India. He was raised and received primary education in Mahindwara. He obtained higher education in geography honours from B. R. Ambedkar Bihar University in Muzaffarpur, he later studied Master of Journalism and Mass Communication (MJMC) from the Uttar Pradesh Rajarshi Tandon Open University, Allahabad.

Personal life
According to the Brahmin family culture he underwent an upanayan initiation at age eleven. He married M. Prabhat, in Bettiah on 18 May 1989. They have a son and two daughters.

Literary career
Prabhat has been writing since 1987 in various subjects. He is also chief editor of VatVriksh & Parikalpana Samay (Hindi Magazine).

Some of his works have been translated into other languages and published in various literary magazines and anthologies

Writings and style
Prabhat is a realistic poet, often writing about social topics and human suffering. His work often touches the concept of human suffering and social issues.

Blogging

Prabhat has written and edited works on Hindi blogging, and has also published his writing in the form of a blog. He started blogging in 2007, and has published fiction as well as reviews of other blogs.

Prabhat is a founding member of the Parikalpna Award, a blog literary award in India. It is presented by the magazine Parikalpana Samay and the Non-governmental organization Parikalpnaa. The first Parikalpna Award was presented on 30 April 2011.

Bibliography

Books
Fiction
Taki Bacha Rahe Loktantra(2011)  (Hindi)
Prem Na Hat Bikay (2012)  (Hindi)
Dharati Pakad Nirdaliya (2013)  (Hindi)
Lakhanaua Kakka(2018) (Bhojpuri)
Kashmir 370 kilometer (Notion Press, 2019)  (Hindi)
Dhartiputri Sita (Notion Press, 2020)  (Hindi)
Pratishruti (Notion Press, 2021)  (Hindi)
Non-fiction
Contemporary Nepali Literature (Hindi: समकालीन नेपाली साहित्य) (critical writings,essays and interviews,1995)
History of Hindi Blogging (Hindi: हिन्दी ब्लॉगिंग का इतिहास) (2011)  (Hindi)
Contributor to Hindi Blogging: Expression of new revolution (Hindi: हिन्दी ब्लॉगिंग: अभिव्यक्ति की नई क्रांति) (2011) 
Hindi Bhasha ke vividh ayam (Rashtriy Aur Antarrashtriy Pariprekshya men)(2018)  (Hindi essays collection)
Responsibility Awareness & Public Behavior (Hindi: दायित्व बोध और लोक व्यवहार) (Notion Press, 2019)  (Hindi/English)
Social Media and Us (Hindi: samajik midia aur ham) (Notion Press, 2020)  (Hindi)
SHARE MARKET(Nivesh Ke Tareeke)(Notion Press, 2020)  (Hindi)
Dr. Mithilesh Dikshit ka sahitya srijan evam pradey (Hindi: डॉ. मिथिलेश दीक्षित का साहित्य सृजन एवं प्रदेय) (Parikalpana Samay Publications Lucknow, 2021)  (Hindi)
Media aur Social Media (Indraprasth Prakashan Delhi, 2021)  (Hindi)

Documentaries
Naya Bihan (Screen Play Writer, 1992) television documentary film on Women's Education under the UNESCO related plan of Unit of Sitamarhi District in "Bihar Education Project".

Poetry collections
Ham Safar (1991) (his first poetry collection) 
Mat Rona Ramjani Chacha (1999)
Smriti Shesh (2002)

Magazines
Urvija 1992 to 1995. Published at Sitamarhi, Bihar in India.
 Fagunahat, 1990 to 1992a yearly magazine published at Sitamarh, Bihar in India.
Samvad, 1993, editor of a special issue of this monthly magazine, whose principal editor was Basant Arya.
Sahityanjali, 1994. editor of a special issue of this monthly magazine, whose principal editor was Madhvendra Verma.
Hamari Vani 2010, a Hindi e-journal. he was consulting editor for the year 2010.
Parikalpna Blogotsav, 2012 - . He is chief editor of this Internet web journal.
Vatvriksh, May 2011 to May 2013. A Hindi magazine published in Lucknow. He is chief editor.
Parikalpana Samay, June 2013 - A monthly Hindi magazine published in Lucknow. He is chief editor.

Adaptations of Prabhat's works
Dr. Siyaram written a Book of Prabhat's works-
Ravindra Prabhat Ki Parikalpana aur Blog alochana karm(2017)  (Hindi)
Audiobook: Prem Na Haat Bikay (Narrator: Ashish Jain) 
Audiobook: Dharati Pakad Nirdaliy (Narrator: Kafeel Jafri)
Echoes of the Getaway (Notion Press, 2020)  (The original book in Hindi Kashmir 370 kilometer was translated into English by Gautam Roy)
Audiobook: Kashmir 370 kilometer on Storytel (Narrator: Mukul Srivastava)
Audiobook: Echoes of the Getaway Behind the dark shadows of the Valley on Storytel (Narrator: Mukul Srivastava)
Audiobook: "Pratishruti" on Storytel (Narrator: Mukul Srivastava)
Audiobook: "Dhartiputri Sita" on Storytel (Narrator:Kusum verma)

References

External links

 
 Ravindra Prabhat - Profile and Biography in Veethi
 Parikalpana Samay (Hindi)
 The creative fragrance of Ravindra Prabhat, South Asia Today
Hindi Novelist Ravindra Prabhat
A global database of Hindi scholars and institutions
The Biography of Ravindra Prabhat
Calling for a code for positive Net effect(Hindustan Times)
Echoes of the Getaway : Very interesting and informative for the readers.(Trend Today)
I've discovered a list of the best books to read in 2020.

1969 births
Hindi-language poets
Screenwriters from Bihar
Indian male journalists
Journalists from Bihar
Indian male novelists
Living people
People from Sitamarhi district
Hindi-language writers
Indian columnists
Indian magazine editors
Indian male poets
Poets from Bihar
20th-century Indian novelists
20th-century Indian poets
20th-century Indian journalists
Novelists from Bihar
20th-century Indian male writers
Babasaheb Bhimrao Ambedkar Bihar University alumni